WTCL-LD (channel 6) is a low-power television station in Cleveland, Ohio, United States, affiliated with Telemundo. It is owned by Gray Television alongside two full-power sister stations: Shaker Heights–licensed CBS affiliate WOIO (channel 19) and Lorain–licensed CW affiliate WUAB (channel 43); WTCL-LD also functions as an ultra high frequency (UHF) repeater for WOIO and WUAB. All three stations share studios at Reserve Square in downtown Cleveland; WTCL-LD's transmitter is located in suburban Parma.

After briefly carrying a hybrid modern rock/talk format, a lease to TSJ Media resulted in the installation of a Spanish language radio format as "La Mega 87.7", the first such format to operate on a full-time basis in the market. Increasing technical complications and limitations forced WLFM-LP to convert to digital in July 2020. A sale to Gray Television the following year saw the station relaunched as the market's first Telemundo affiliate.

History

Early history and attempted digital conversion 
This station signed on as a low-power station on channel 47 on November 30, 1989, using the sequentially assigned W47BE call sign. Moving to channel 65 (which had been previously reserved for commercial UHF broadcasts in the early 1950s which were never built) on April 15, 1998, the calls were changed to W65DL, then adopted the WXOX-LP calls on January 12, 2000. In the final years as WXOX, the station was affiliated with the Home Shopping Network (HSN).

WXOX-LP filed paperwork requesting the station move to channel 44 and increase power to 120 kW, but amended the request for digital conversion. Federal Communications Commission (FCC) findings stated channel 44 would cause interference with adjacent WNEO, prompting WXOX-LP to request broadcasting over a subchannel of WCDN-LP. WXOX-LP was then forced off the air on October 27, 2009, when wireless carrier Verizon purchased the part of the wireless spectrum where the station had been broadcasting. An attempt was made to convert WXOX to a low-power digital station on channel 31, which WJW broadcast from prior to the June 12, 2009, analog shutoff date. Due to potential co-channel interference issues with CITY-DT-2 in Woodstock, Ontario, which also broadcast on RF channel 31, the application was abandoned.

As a "Franken-FM" radio station

87.7 Cleveland's Sound 
After entering into an operating agreement with Murray Hill Broadcasting—headed by former WWWE, WRMR and WDOK co-owner Tom Wilson and aligned with Venture executive Paul Koplin—Wilson announced the launch of a personality-driven alternative rock/talk format, using the WLFM-LP call sign which Venture transferred from their low-power channel 6 station in Chicago.

With studios located within the Cleveland Agora, what became known as "87.7 Cleveland's Sound" was originally scheduled to launch in July 2012, but did not debut until September 9, 2012. WLFM-LP aired a taped loop of Cleveland-themed sports songs and "My Town" as a prolonged stunt, while the TV signal displayed either a loop of slides of local landmarks, or a screensaver for Western Digital. A casting call was conducted for possible air talent, with former WKRK-FM host Rachel Steele named as afternoon host and former WFBQ program director Marty Bender assuming like duties. Former WMMS personalities Dan Stansbury and Chad Zumock were later added to the airstaff.

Readers of Cleveland Scene awarded WLFM-LP as "Best Local Radio Station" in 2013. The station also featured area local music show Inner Sanctum but the program was cancelled in September 2013; host Pat Johnson said the station "was hoping for a big summer and that hasn't translated into sales yet".

La Mega 87.7 

Murray Hill Broadcasting announced a local marketing agreement (LMA) with Cincinnati-based TSJ Media on December 11, 2013, effectively changing WLFM-LP to a Spanish language radio format, de facto becoming the first full-time Hispanic radio station in Cleveland proper. Tom Wilson viewed Murray Hill's LMA with TSJ Media as "a significant upgrade of an opportunity... sometimes you just don't realize what opportunity is there until somebody presents it to you. It's really the way to go". When the LMA took effect on January 1, 2014, WLFM-LP was renamed "La Mega 87.7: Latino and Proud", boasting an airstaff that included several area disc jockeys. TSJ Media would later be acquired by Columbus-based La Mega Media, Inc., on April 16, 2019.

Beginning with the 2014–15 NBA season, WLFM-LP carried Spanish-language broadcasts of the Cleveland Cavaliers, then added Spanish-language broadcasts of the Cleveland Browns in 2018; Rafael Hernandez Brito served as play-by-play announcer for both teams.

Conversion to digital 
WLFM-LP suspended operations on February 26, 2019, when WOUC-TV in Cambridge, Ohio, moved to RF channel 6 during the repacking of broadcast spectrum initiated by the FCC's 2016 auction; WLFM-LP returned to the air several days later with a power reduction to 3 watts. While low-power television stations operating as "Franken-FMs", including WLFM-LP, had deadlines for digital conversion extended multiple times by the FCC, the spectrum repack forced the station to convert to digital broadcasting on RF channel 20. Thus, WLFM-LP discontinued analog broadcasting on June 30, 2020, with the "La Mega 87.7" format moved to an internet-only platform.

On July 29, 2020, the renamed WLFM-LD launched, carrying Jewelry Television as a temporary affiliation.

Sale to Gray and Telemundo affiliation 
Murray Hill Broadcasting sold WLFM-LD to WOIO and WUAB owner Gray Television on July 29, 2021, for $1.65 million, which the FCC approved on September 13. Shortly thereafter, Gray announced WLFM-LD would adopt the WTCL call sign and join Telemundo on January 1, 2022; prior to this, Cleveland was the largest market in the United States not to have a dedicated Telemundo affiliate. The new station would also have evening newscasts in Spanish produced by WOIO, the first such newscasts to be broadcast in the Cleveland market, as Univision-owned WQHS-DT only carries remotely-produced news briefs. WOIO previously produced a daily Spanish-language newscast, Al Día, for their website, social media and OTT services, but was suspended due to the COVID-19 pandemic; WOIO retained both Al Día reporters and planned to hire two additional bilingual reporters.

WLFM-LD was renamed WTCL-LP on October 15, 2021, and adopted the -LD suffix on August 5, 2022.

Technical information

Subchannels 
The station's digital signal is multiplexed:

References

External links 

Defunct radio stations in the United States
Television channels and stations established in 1989
1989 establishments in Ohio
TCL-LD
Low-power television stations in the United States
Gray Television
Telemundo network affiliates
Spanish-language mass media in Ohio
Circle (TV network) affiliates
CBS network affiliates
The CW affiliates